Hrianghmun, also known as Hiangmun, is a village in the Champhai district of Mizoram, India. The villagers speak Tedim language which found its root in Myanmar. It is located in the Ngopa R.D. Block. It is inhabited by the Zomi people. Some villagers particularly Naulak boy who are currently residing in Aizawl are advocating to change Hrianghmun to Hiangmun.

History 

On 25 January 1945 refugees from the Chindwin River area, the thirty houses of 162 members built Hiangmun in India to escape an outbreak of cholera and the Second World War. Hiangmun is located near Teikhang and was originally administered from there. The village authority name was Taivel. On 9 November 1948 the village construction license was issued by Mangpipa Macdonald.

Geography and climate 

Hiangmun lies on the North-Eastern part of Champhai district in Mizoram State between 23.9712886N latitude and 93.2916906E longitude. The name is a combination of two words Hiang (the trees' name) and Mun (location) then Hiang location is Hiangmun. The tree is much abundant and well at this place. Therefore the place is called as Hiangmun. The village is bounded on the north by Mimbung, on the east by the Chin State of Myanmar, on the south by Teikhang and on the west by Ngopa.

Demographics 

 According to the 2011 census of India, Hrianghmun has 115 households. The effective literacy rate (i.e. the literacy rate of population excluding children aged 6 and below) is 83.9%.

Religion

All the villagers follow Christianity. There are three churches: Zomi Baptist Church, Evangelical Baptist Convention Church, and the Presbyterian Church of India.

Institutions and public properties
Institutions and public properties: Agawuadi Centre I & II; one crochet centre; Sarva Siksha Abhyan primary school owned by the central government, Government Primary and Government Middle School, one private Middle English Medium School, Bethel English Medium School owned by the Evangelical Baptist Convention Church; one playground; one community hall; and three village council members.

Culture

Hiangmun Memorial Cup 

During 18 December 1968 to January 1972, the village was grouped to Mimbung village. Since then, the villagers organised a football tournament in memory of re-construction of the Hiangmun village between Christmas and New year. After the ended of the grouping in 1972, the camped villagers went back to their village and constructed a new Hiangmun within the old village. The younger and the older villagers yearned for their olden days. The poem "Mimbang Pianna Hiangtui Vangkhua" was recited by some young villagers. This poem is the theme song of the memorial cup:

Khuado Pawi 

Khuado Pawi is the most important that Zomi all over the world celebrates every year; which is also called The harvest festival of Zomis in English. This cultural festival features refreshments, traditional & cultural shows, games is a theme of our desire that is building our love, care, an acquaintance among all the Zomi community
..

Other 

The Hiangmun Golden Jubilee was celebrated in 1995.

References 

Villages in Ngopa block